meta-Hydroxynorephedrine or 3-hydroxynorephedrine, also known as 3,β-dihydroxyamphetamine, is an adrenergic drug of the amphetamine class which was patented as a vasopressor and nasal decongestant but was never marketed. It is the racemic form of the sympathomimetic drug metaraminol.

See also 
 Hydroxynorephedrine
 Metaraminol
 Gepefrine
 Phenylpropanolamine

References 

Alpha-adrenergic agonists
Substituted amphetamines
Cardiac stimulants
Phenols